Zhangshan Canyon is located in Jixi County, Anhui Province, China. The most famous landmark is a special rock which looks like the face of former Chinese Communist Party chairman Mao Zedong.

Landforms of Anhui
Anhui articles missing geocoordinate data
Tourist attractions in Anhui
Canyons and gorges of China
Xuancheng